Faik Ergin (born 16 February 1978, İskenderun), is a Turkish actor and model, who won the Turkish contests Best Model of Turkey and Best Model of World in 2000.
He is graduated in Civil Engineering from Istanbul Technical University (ITU).

Performances 

Faik Ergin has been acting for over 14 years in theatre, television, and movies.
Since January 2014, Ergin began working on Küçük Ağa. He plays the role of Doctor Yusuf.

Theatre 

Ayışığı Tarifesi

Movies 

Aşk Nerede (2015)
Şarkıcı (2001)

Television 

Küçük Ağa (Yusuf); 2014
Galip Derviş (Ali "Topan" Sönmezoğlu); 2013
Uygun Adım Aşk (Tayfun)
Genco (Tibet); 2007
Öteki Oğul (Sadık)
Sakın Söyleme (İsmail)
Hacı (Deniz)
İffet (Sinan)
Gümüş (Berk)
Fosforlu Cevriye

References 
http://songuncel.blogspot.de/2014/01/kucuk-aga-dizisi-yusuf-faik-ergin.html#ixzz31yLhQgvM
http://www.hurriyet.com.tr/magazin/haber/26266599.asp

1978 births
Living people